Ryan John McPartlin (born July 3, 1975) is an American actor, known for his role as Devon "Captain Awesome" Woodcomb on the NBC action-comedy series Chuck.

Early life
McPartlin was born in Chicago, Illinois, to Steve and Lois McPartlin. He was raised in Glen Ellyn, Illinois (a suburb of Chicago), and attended Glenbard South High School. McPartlin graduated with a degree in speech communication from the University of Illinois at Urbana–Champaign. He was a member of the Illinois Fighting Illini football team as a walk-on tight end from 1993-95. McPartlin's older brother, Chris, was also a member of the Illinois football team, earning a varsity letter as a linebacker in 1994. After six months in Australia and New Zealand, McPartlin moved to Southern California to pursue acting as a career.

Career

McPartlin spent years as an Abercrombie & Fitch model. McPartlin's first acting role was on The Nanny with Fran Drescher as a Leonardo DiCaprio-type character in a Titanic spoof. McPartlin has been mostly known for his role as Hank Bennett on the popular soap opera Passions replacing Dalton James from April 2001 until June 2004 and made a brief appearance in the series L.A. 7 as Ryan. McPartlin worked with Drescher again as Riley Martin on the television sitcom Living with Fran playing her much younger live-in boyfriend. Living with Fran was canceled on May 17, 2006, after two seasons. McPartlin originally auditioned for the role of Clark Kent/Superman in the film Superman Returns, but lost the role to Brandon Routh. In 2008, Ryan participated in Mad Men, playing an affair of January Jones's character, Betty Draper.

McPartlin also played Devon "Captain Awesome" Woodcomb on NBC's Chuck from 2007 to 2012. In mid-2011, McPartlin appeared in Sugarland's music video "Stuck Like Glue" as a man being stalked and abducted by lead singer Jennifer Nettles. McPartlin appears in commercials for Kate Walsh's perfume "Boyfriend". In March 2012, McPartlin began working with the website LiveLifeLocal to help promote active lifestyles and is filming a series of videos for the site. In 2014, he portrayed the recurring roles of police detective Dwayne Freeman on Mystery Girls and Billy the fireman on Bad Judge.

Personal life
McPartlin is a certified personal trainer. He has been married to former actress Danielle Kirlin, whom he met at the University of Illinois, since October 26, 2002, and has two sons. McPartlin's hobbies include scuba diving, tennis, snowboarding, and racquetball.

Filmography

Film

Television

Web

Music videos

References

External links

 

1975 births
Living people
20th-century American male actors
21st-century American male actors
American exercise instructors
American male film actors
Male models from Illinois
American male soap opera actors
American male television actors
Illinois Fighting Illini football players
Male actors from Chicago
People from Glen Ellyn, Illinois
University of Illinois Urbana-Champaign alumni